José Luis Clerc was the defending champion, but lost in the second round to Thierry Tulasne.

Andrés Gómez won the title by defeating Aaron Krickstein 6–2, 6–2 in the final.

Seeds

Draw

Finals

Top half

Section 1

Section 2

Bottom half

Section 3

Section 4

References

External links
 Official results archive (ATP)
 Official results archive (ITF)

Sovran Bank Classic Doubles
Washington Star International
Washington Star International